Holy Cross Cemetery, located at 3620 Tilden Avenue in East Flatbush, Brooklyn, New York City, is an American Roman Catholic cemetery operated by the Diocese of Brooklyn.

Notable burials

 Jean H. Norris – Lawyer and first female magistrate of New York City.
 John J. Bennett Jr. – Soldier and lawyer
 Diamond Jim Brady – American businessman and philanthropist
 John Bullman – American jockey
 Tommy Burns – Canadian and U.S. Hall of Fame  jockey
 Louis Capone – Organized crime figure
 James Carey – Medal of Honor recipient
 John Michael Clancy – U.S. Representative
 Walter Donaldson – Songwriter
 "Sunny Jim" Fitzsimmons – American Hall of Fame racehorse trainer
 Joseph C. H. Flynn – Lawyer, politician, and magistrate
 Edward H. Garrison – American Hall of Fame jockey
 William Russell Grace (1832–1904) – Irish-American businessman and former Mayor of New York City
 Gil Hodges (1924–1972) – Major League Baseball player and manager
 Patrick Keely – Architect
 Ardolph Loges Kline – New York City Mayor, U.S. Representative
 Frank J. Macchiarola – Chancellor of the New York City Schools, 1978–83
 Hugh McLaughlin – Boss of the Brooklyn Democratic Party in the late 1800s
 William R. Pelham – Medal of Honor recipient
 Albert Weisbogel  – two-time Medal of Honor recipient (unmarked grave)
 Frankie Yale (1893–1928) – Organized crime figure
 Mícheál Ó Lócháin (1836–1899) – One of the foremost activists in behalf of the Irish Gaelic language in the United States. Founded the first periodical in which Irish Gaelic had a major place.
 Timothy Donoghue (1825–1908) – Medal of Honor recipient during American Civil War

External links 
 
 Brooklyn Catholic Cemeteries the official site
 Interment.net entry

Roman Catholic cemeteries in New York (state)
Cemeteries in Brooklyn
Roman Catholic Diocese of Brooklyn